Warner–Lambert was an American pharmaceutical company.

History
Formerly two separate entities, the first company was started in 1856, when William R. Warner founded a drug store in Philadelphia. Warner went on to invent a tablet coating process gaining him a place in the Smithsonian Institution. The second half of the name came from Jordan Wheat Lambert, founder of the Lambert Pharmacal Company of St. Louis, famous for Listerine. The two companies merged in 1955, to form Warner–Lambert.

Over the years, the company expanded through many mergers and acquisitions to become an international competitor in several businesses. In 1956, Warner-Lambert acquired Nepera Chemical (the makers of Anahist) from the Lasdon family, many of whom then became officers and directors of the merged business. In 1976, Warner–Lambert took over Parke-Davis, which was  founded in Detroit in 1866, by Hervey Parke and George Davis. This was followed by acquisitions of Wilkinson Sword in March 1993, and Agouron Pharmaceuticals in January 1999.

Its subsidiary Parke-Davis marketed the antidiabetic drug Rezulin, which was approved by the FDA in January 1997 but withdrawn by them in early 2000. 

In the end of the 1990s, Warner–Lambert formed an alliance with Pfizer to bring its drug Lipitor to market. Lipitor launched in January 1997 to resounding success, reaching $1B in domestic sales within its first twelve months on the market. In February 2000, Pfizer bought Warner Lambert along with all of its subsidiary companies. The headquarters of Warner–Lambert in Morris Plains, New Jersey, subsequently used by Pfizer, Johnson & Johnson, and Honeywell.

References

External links
Warner-Lambert: A History, Pfizer

Pharmaceutical companies based in New Jersey
Pfizer
Pharmaceutical companies established in 1856
Pharmaceutical companies disestablished in 2000
Companies based in Morris County, New Jersey
Defunct companies based in New Jersey
1856 establishments in Pennsylvania
2000 mergers and acquisitions
2000 disestablishments in New Jersey